Guido Pella was the defending champion, but chose not to compete.
Alejandro González defeated Renzo Olivo 4–6, 6–3, 7–6(9–7) in the final to win the title.

Seeds

Draw

Finals

Top half

Bottom half

References
 Main Draw
 Qualifying Draw

Challenger ATP de Salinas Diario Expreso - Singles
2013 Singles